Vitisin A is a resveratrol tetramer found in plants of the genus Vitis. It is  a complex of two resveratrol dimers, (+)-epsilon-viniferin and ampelopsin B.

It shows an opposite effect to hopeaphenol on apoptosis of myocytes isolated from adult rat heart.

References

External links 
 Website of the Schröder group

Resveratrol oligomers
Natural phenol tetramers
Grape